Maria of Nassau or Maria of Orange-Nassau (5 September 1642 – 20 March 1688) was a Dutch princess of the house of Orange and by marriage pfalzgräfin or countess of Simmern-Kaiserslautern.

Life
Maria was born in The Hague, the youngest daughter of Amalia of Solms-Braunfels and her husband Frederick Henry, Prince of Orange. Her father was already in his late fifties when she was born and died when she was only four. She was also the aunt of the future William III, via her brother William II. In 1660 her family began negotiations for her to marry Charles II of Great Britain. However, in the end he opted to marry Catharine of Braganza to establish an anti-Spanish alliance with Portugal. A year later marriage negotiations with John Maurice, Prince of Nassau-Siegen began, but these also proved abortive.

On 23 September 1666 in Kleve she married Louis Henry, Count Palatine of Simmern-Kaiserslautern (1640-1674), son of Louis Philip and a grandson of Maria's aunt Countess Louise Juliana of Nassau. Like her sisters' marriages, Maria's marriage was intended to draw the network of Calvinist princes closer together. Maria and Louis Henry were married eight years but the marriage proved childless and on her husband's death the Simmern-Kaiserslautern line died out.

Maria kept up a correspondence with her two surviving sisters after her marriage. Like her sisters Louise Henriette with the Oranienburg, Albertine Agnes with the Oranienstein and Henriette Catherine with Oranienbaum, Maria built herself a new palace after her marriage - she completed hers in 1669 at Bad Kreuznach and named it Schloss Oranienhof. Maria died in 1688 at Kreuznach after six days of pneumonia and Schloss Oranienhof was destroyed by French troops in the Nine Years' War a year later.

Ancestry

External links 
  De kinderen van Prins Willem „de Zwijger“ (1533–1584) van Oranje-Nassau Prins van Oranje in 1544.
  Wil Tiemes: Maria prinses van Oranje (1642–1688). In: Digitaal Vrouwenlexicon van Nederland. 2013.

1642 births
1688 deaths
17th-century Dutch women
Deaths from pneumonia in Germany
House of Orange-Nassau
House of Palatinate-Simmern
Nobility from The Hague
Princesses of Orange-Nassau
Daughters of monarchs